Marco Martin (born 25 December 1987) is an Italian footballer who plays as a defender for Montebelluna in Serie D.

Career
Martin was acquired by Pescara on loan from Südtirol on 27 December 2011 to strengthen the team's defensive core.  He was half of the duo brought in by Zdeněk Zeman during the winter transfer window, along with midfielder Matti Lund Nielsen.

On 30 June 2015 Martin was signed by Pavia.

On 14 January 2019, he joined Vicenza Virtus.

References

External links
 Pescara Calcio profile
 

1987 births
People from Pordenone
Footballers from Friuli Venezia Giulia
Living people
Italian footballers
Association football defenders
Treviso F.B.C. 1993 players
U.S. Viterbese 1908 players
F.C. Südtirol players
Delfino Pescara 1936 players
F.C. Pavia players
Pordenone Calcio players
A.S. Cittadella players
FeralpiSalò players
L.R. Vicenza players
Calcio Montebelluna players
Serie B players
Serie C players
Serie D players